Chempakamangalam Sreebhadrakaali devi Temple is an ancient pilgrim centre situated in Aryanadu, Tholoor, Thiruvananthapuram. The Goddess Badrakaali Amma is the main deity in this temple. One important aspect of the temple is that, the deity appears as 'Durgabhagavathi' which is an avatar of 'AdiParasakthi'. Being satisfied at our offerings, Sree Badrakaali Amma provides us truth, kindness, knowledge, morality and end to grief. Indeed, every activity of a devotee out of delight imbibing from the Almighty is a great deed.

References 

Hindu temples in Thiruvananthapuram district
Devi temples in Kerala